Abdul Reza Shahlai is an Iranian military officer with the rank of brigadier general who serves as the commander of the Yemen division of Quds Force of the Islamic Revolutionary Guard Corps.

Designation as a terrorist by the US
Shahlai is classified by the US government as a terrorist for his funding of terror groups and his links to attacks on US troops in Iraq, including a 2007 raid that killed five US soldiers in Karbala. Other alleged attacks led by Shalai include a failed assassination attempt on the Saudi ambassador in Washington DC, Adel Al-Jubeir. As such, the US State Department has put a $US 15 million bounty on Shahlai, through the Rewards for Justice Program, for information leading to his whereabouts.

2020 assassination attempt by the US
On the night of 3 January, the US military attempted to assassinate Shahlai via drone strike in conjunction with the assassination of the head of the Quds Force Qasem Soleimani in the Baghdad International Airport airstrike. The drone strike in Sana'a, where Shahlai was based, failed to kill him but did lead to the death of lower-ranked IRGC member Mohammad Mirza. This is the first combat death the Quds Force has acknowledged in Yemen.

On 10 January, the US State Department admitted to the attempted assassination of Shahlai but did not announce it on the same date as the Soleimani assassination because the Shahlai assassination was unsuccessful. This led to speculation the 3 January drone strikes were wider decapitation hits aimed at taking out the Quds Force leadership.

Death rumor 
An Islamic Republic News Agency report initially called COVID-19 victim Hasan Irlu a repatriated Qods Corps officer and Iranian envoy to Yemen, Shahlai.

See also 
List of fugitives from justice who disappeared
USA kill or capture strategy in Iraq
Assassination of Qasem Soleimani

References

1957 births
Fugitives
Fugitives wanted by the United States
Iran–United States relations
Islamic Revolutionary Guard Corps brigadier generals
Living people
People from Kermanshah
Quds Force personnel
Iranian individuals subject to the U.S. Department of the Treasury sanctions
21st-century Iranian military personnel